Jack Fairless was manager of the English football club Darlington from 1928 to 1933.

Managerial statistics

External links

Darlington F.C. managers
Year of death missing
Year of birth missing
English football managers